Xanthoparmelia montanensis is a lichen which belongs to the Xanthoparmelia genus, it is also known as the Montana Rock-shield Lichen.

Description 
Grows to around 3–6 cm in diameter with lobes which are approximately 0.7-1.5 mm wide with short crowed edges. The upper surface of the lichen is dark yellowish green in color and shiny on the surface. Rhizines are simple in structure and pale forming 0.2-0.5 mm long.  It is the only member of the Xanthoparmelia genus that produces fatty acids which form spots that can be detected with shortwave UV light.

Habitat and range 
Found in Western North American including the US states of Arizona, New Mexico, and Montana.

See also 
 List of Xanthoparmelia species

References 

montanensis
Lichen species
Lichens of North America